Cradle Song is a 1953 Mexican film. It was directed by Fernando de Fuentes.

Plot 
The daughter of a prostitute is abandoned in a convent where a nun cares for her, as she asks to not be taken to an hospice.

Cast 
 María Elena Marqués
 Carmelita González
 Alma Delia Fuentes
 Anita Blanch
 César del Campo
 Sara Guasch
 Fernando Cortés
 Queta Lavat
 Matilde Palou
 Verónica Loyo
 Beatriz Ramos
 Josefina Leiner
 Marcela Quevedo

Reception 
In Historia mínima. La cultura mexicana en el siglo XX, Carlos Monsiváis cites the film when describing what he considers a decline in the career of director Fernando de Fuentes: "The decline is incomprehensible: how is the director of Godfather Mendoza capable of committing monstrosities like Cradle Song (1953) and The Children of Maria Morales (1952)? Is it the exhaustion of a director or the crushing effect of an industry that allows neither rest nor the aesthetic ambitions of its creators?" In Historia del cine mexicano, Emilio García Riera quotes the film together with Sor Alegría (1952) as films that "were about compliant, happy, and heavily made-up nuns."

References

External links 
 

1953 films
1950s Spanish-language films
Films directed by Fernando de Fuentes
Mexican films based on plays
Mexican drama films
1953 drama films
Mexican black-and-white films
1950s Mexican films